Anthony Lopez (born January 22, 1994), better known as Tony Dreams, is an American singer and songwriter from Waco, Texas. In 2016, he began to gain recognition following the release of a collection of four singles, entitled ‘The One’, ‘Come Over’, ‘Do That’, and his first major release ‘Rewind’. ‘Rewind’ was the official debut single for Dreams. It was released on September 10, 2016 through TopNotch Music. ‘Rewind’ was the product of Dreams’ collaboration with DJsNeverEndingStory, former in house producer for the Grammy award-winning music production team, The Trak Starz. Dreams’ other singles garnered success in the R&B/urban community but failed to make a mark in mainstream music.

Dreams currently resides in Northern California with his girlfriend Emily Faubert.

References

Singers from Texas
1994 births
Living people
21st-century American singers
American rhythm and blues singers
American hip hop musicians